Preetam  is a 1971 Bollywood romance film directed by Bhappi Sonie. The film stars Shammi Kapoor and Leena Chandavarkar.

Cast
 Shammi Kapoor as Preetam 
 Leena Chandavarkar as Sharan Sinha / Bindiya
 Vinod Khanna as Anil 
 Helen as Sarita
 Mehmood as Barber Safachat 
 Raj Mehra as Mr. Thakur
 Sulochana Latkar as Mrs. Thakur
 Ramayan Tiwari as Rana 
 Anwar Hussain as Daroga Ram Sahay Singh
 Manmohan (actor) as Pyare
 Malika as Dr. Chhaya Dutt
 Vasant Mahajan as Vasant
 Birbal as Member of Preetam's party
 Kumari Naaz as Gauri 
 Dhumal (actor) as Gauri's Father
 Brahm Bhardwaj as Judge B.N. Sinha
 Urmila Bhatt as Urmila Sinha
 Raj Kishore as Havaldar 913
 Ravikant as (as Ravi Kant)
 Moolchand as Train Guard

Soundtrack

External links
 
 YouTube link Saregama Movies 

1971 films
1970s Hindi-language films
1970s romance films
Films scored by Shankar–Jaikishan
Films directed by Bhappi Sonie
Indian romance films
Hindi-language romance films